President Lee may refer to:

Kim Il-sung (1912–1994), president of North Korea
Kim Young-sam (1927–2015), 7th president of South Korea
Kim Dae-jung (1924–2009), 8th president of South Korea

See also
Kim (surname)